Xenolechia lindae is a moth of the family Gelechiidae. It is found in southern Greece.

References

Moths described in 1999
Xenolechia